Hemicrepidius is a genus of click beetle belonging to the family Elateridae.

Species

 Hemicrepidius acuminatus Champion, 1896
 Hemicrepidius amitinus Champion, 1896
 Hemicrepidius amoenus Philippi, 1861
 Hemicrepidius aterrimus Champion, 1896
 Hemicrepidius biformis Champion, 1896
 Hemicrepidius bilobatus (Say, 1834)
 Hemicrepidius bivittatus Champion, 1896
 Hemicrepidius brevicollis Candèze, 1863
 Hemicrepidius californicus (Becker, 1979)
 Hemicrepidius candezei Champion, 1896
 Hemicrepidius carbonarius (Stepanov, 1935)
 Hemicrepidius carbonatus (LeConte, 1860)
 Hemicrepidius chinensis Kishii & Jiang, 1996
 Hemicrepidius colchicus (Iablokoff-Khnzorian, 1962)
 Hemicrepidius consanguineus Champion, 1896
 Hemicrepidius consobrinus Champion, 1896
 Hemicrepidius consors Heyden, 1884
 Hemicrepidius coreanus Kishii in Kishii & Paik, 2002
 Hemicrepidius corvinus (Reitter, 1905)
 Hemicrepidius cotesi (Candèze, 1895)
 Hemicrepidius cruciatus Champion, 1896
 Hemicrepidius cylindricus Kishii & Jiang, 1996
 Hemicrepidius decoloratus Say, 1836
 Hemicrepidius decorus (Fleutiaux, 1918)
 Hemicrepidius desertor (Candèze, 1873)
 Hemicrepidius dilaticollis (Motschulsky, 1859)
 Hemicrepidius falli (Reitter, 1908)
 Hemicrepidius flavipennis (Cherepanov, 1957)
 Hemicrepidius flavipes Candèze, 1863
 Hemicrepidius germanus Champion, 1896
 Hemicrepidius guizhouensis Kishii & Jiang, 1996
 Hemicrepidius hemipodus (Say, 1825)
 Hemicrepidius hirtus (Herbst, 1784)
 Hemicrepidius indistinctus (LeConte, 1853)
 Hemicrepidius inornata (Lewis, 1894)
 Hemicrepidius instabilis Candèze, 1863
 Hemicrepidius jugicola (Perez Arcas, 1872)
 Hemicrepidius kibane Kishii, 1989
 Hemicrepidius koenigi (Schwarz, 1897)
 Hemicrepidius kumaso Kishii, 2001
 Hemicrepidius longicollis Candèze, 1863
 Hemicrepidius longicornis Champion, 1896
 Hemicrepidius longipennis (Candèze, 1863)
 Hemicrepidius memnonius (Herbst, 1806)
 Hemicrepidius montanus Lane, 1965
 Hemicrepidius morio (LeConte, 1853)
 Hemicrepidius niger (Linnaeus, 1758)
 Hemicrepidius nigripennis (Miwa, 1928)
 Hemicrepidius nigritulus Reitter, 1890
 Hemicrepidius nitidus Champion, 1896
 Hemicrepidius oblongus (Solsky, 1871)
 Hemicrepidius pallidipennis (Mannerheim, 1843)
 Hemicrepidius palpalis (Fall, 1907)
 Hemicrepidius parvulus Champion, 1896
 Hemicrepidius patruelis Champion, 1896
 Hemicrepidius pictipes (Chevrolat, 1843)
 Hemicrepidius pullus Reitter, 1905
 Hemicrepidius raddei (Faust, 1877)
 Hemicrepidius rufangulus (Miwa, 1928)
 Hemicrepidius ruficornis (Kirby, 1837)
 Hemicrepidius schneideri (Kiesenwetter, 1878)
 Hemicrepidius secessus (Candèze, 1873)
 Hemicrepidius simplex (LeConte, 1876)
 Hemicrepidius sinuatus (Lewis, 1894)
 Hemicrepidius soccifer (LeConte, 1876)
 Hemicrepidius subcyaneus (Motschulsky, 1866)
 Hemicrepidius subopacus Kishii & Jiang, 1996
 Hemicrepidius subpectinatus Schwarz, 1902
 Hemicrepidius tartarus (Candèze, 1860)
 Hemicrepidius terukoanus Kishii, 1961
 Hemicrepidius thomasi Germar, 1839
 Hemicrepidius tonkinensis Schwarz, 1902
 Hemicrepidius tumescens (LeConte, 1861)
 Hemicrepidius variabilis (Fleutiaux, 1918)
 Hemicrepidius vulpeculus Reitter, 1890

References
 Biolib
 Fauna Europaea

 
Elateridae genera